Book of John may refer to:

Gospel of John
Mandaean Book of John, a Mandaean text
Secret Book of John, a Gnostic text
Book of the Secret Supper, or "Book of John the Evangelist", a Bogomil text